Márk Szécsi (born 22 May 1994 in Eger) is a Hungarian football player currently playing for the Hungarian team Debreceni VSC as a midfielder.

Club statistics

Updated to games played as of 15 May 2022.

External links 
 MLSZ

References

1994 births
Living people
Sportspeople from Eger
Hungarian footballers
Association football forwards
Debreceni VSC players
Kecskeméti TE players
Nyíregyháza Spartacus FC players
Puskás Akadémia FC players
Nemzeti Bajnokság I players